Sándor Kallós (also "Shandor Kallosh") (born 23 October 1935, Chernivtsi, Ukraine) is a Russian composer of Hungarian descent, a noted proponent of musical Minimalism, an influential pioneer of the early music revival and electronic music in the USSR, lutenist, and a prolific author of incidental music for film, animation, theater, and ballet.

Biography 
Sándor Kallós was born on 23 October 1935 in Chernivtsi. He matriculated from the Lviv Conservatory in 1961, having studied composition under Adam Sołtys. His graduate studies were at Moscow Conservatory (class of Yuri Shaporin, 1962–1964).
In 1954-1963, he worked as a violinist in various symphony orchestras. From 1971, he appeared as a lutenist (notably as the accompanist to Karina, Ruzanna and Pavel Lisitsian), and from 1975 as a conductor.

List of works

Sacred works 
 "5 Hymns & Halleluiah from Byzantine Hermologe" (in Classical Greek) for soloists, chorus a capella and tape.
 "Credo" for viola d'amore and 6-channell electronics.
 "Sacred Chamber Music on Catalan Themes from the 17th century".
 "David's Psalms" (in Classical Greek) for voice and lute.

Secular works

Symphonic works 
 1st Symphony (1957),
 2nd Symphony (1960),
 3rd Symphony (1961),
 4th Symphony (1976),
 Violin Concerto #1 (1964),
 Violin Concerto #2 (1969);
 Concerto for viola, double bass and оrch. (1977);

Instrumental music 
 5 Pieces for Lute, Theremin and tape
 "Dialoghi" for viola d'amore and tape
 3 Ricercari (Три ричеркара) for viola solo

Incidental music (theater) 
 "Merlin"
 "St. Petersburg Tales"

Ballets 
 "Macbeth"
 "Faust"
 "A Wedding Voyage"
 "The Princess of the Moon"
 "Alice in Wonderland"
 "Antigone"
 "Dances of Death"

Operas 
 "Kupriyanov and Natasha"
 "Daphne"
 "Darling Giaccomina"
 "Royal Games"

Film music 
 Island (short) (1973)
 I Give You This Star (1974)
 Border dog Alyi (1979)
  A Few Things From the Provincial Life  (1983)
  A Lady's Visit  (1989)
  I'm again with You 
  Wild Love 
  A Princess and the Beans  (1997)
 Dandelion Wine (1997)
  Evil's Allure  (2006)
Hoffmaniada (2018)

References

External links 
 Sándor Kallós on IMDb
 New York Times filmography

1935 births
Living people
20th-century classical composers
21st-century classical composers
Composers for lute
Historicist composers
Hungarian composers
Hungarian male composers
Lutenists
Minimalist composers
Musicians from Chernivtsi
Postminimalist composers
Russian classical composers
Russian male classical composers
Russian film score composers
Male film score composers
Russian people of Hungarian descent
Ukrainian classical composers
Ukrainian people of Hungarian descent
20th-century Russian male musicians
21st-century Russian male musicians